Joseph Riepel (Rainbach im Mühlkreis, 22 January 1709 - Regensburg, 23 October 1782) was an Austrian-born German music theorist, composer and violinist. Riepel is known for his theoretical work, especially for his innovations in theory of melody and form. Riepel's writings form one of the foundations for the theory of composition of the later 18th century. He was violin teacher to František Xaver Pokorný.

Riepel was the son of a farmer and innkeeper. He attended the Jesuit College in Steyr and began philosophical studies in Linz and Graz, but distinguished himself early on as a violinist. In 1735–1736 he toured the Balkan Peninsula as valet of General Alexander Graf d'Ollone in the 7th Austrian war against the Turks. From 1739 to 1745 he lived in Dresden, where he claims to  have regularly frequented  Jan Dismas Zelenka and the concertmaster Johann Georg Pisendel had by his own admission and received his first real musical training here. After living in Poland and Vienna, in 1749 he was band master at the court of the Princes of Thurn and Taxis in Regensburg, where he spent the rest of his life and created his theoretical writings and the majority of his compositions.

Works
Responsoria pro Parasceve, Responsoria pro Sabbato Sancto
Anfangsgründe zur Musikalischen Setzkunst (1752)
Grundregeln zur Tonordnung insgemein (1755)
Gründliche Erklärung der Tonordnung insbesondere, zugleich aber für die mehresten Organisten insgemein (1757)
Erläuterung der betrüglichen Tonordnung (1765)
Unentbehrliche Anmerkungen zum Contrapunct (1768)
Baßschlüssel. das ist, Anleitung für Anfänger und Liebhaber der Setzkunst, die schöne Gedanken haben und zu Papier bringen, aber nur klagen, daß sie keinen Baß recht dazu zu setzen wissen (1786)

References

 Emmerig 1984, Grove Music Online, MGG, Primärquellen
 Ulrich Kaiser (Hrsg.): Musiktheoretische Quellen 1750–1800. Gedruckte Schriften von J. Riepel, H. Chr. Koch, J. F. Daube und J. A. Scheibe (= Zeno.org 15). Mit einem Vorwort und einer Bibliographie von Stefan Eckert und Ulrich Kaiser. Directmedia, Berlin 2007, .

1709 births
1782 deaths
18th-century German composers
18th-century male musicians